Craig "Craigums" Martin Billmeier (born October 18, 1973), also known as Hot Lixx Hulahan, is an American punk musician, multi-instrumentalist, two-time US National Air Guitar Champion (2006 and 2008), and the 2008 World Air Guitar Champion.  In 2001 he wrote a book, Naked Shackleton, about his trip to Antarctica.  In it, he claims to have visited all seven continents.  After his 2006 air guitar victory he was hired as the actor for the video game series Rock Band.

Bands 
 Your Mother (vocals, guitar, drums) (1989–2000)
 All You Can Eat (bass, vocals) (1993–1998)
 Rocket Queens (guitar, "Slosh") (1999— )
 What Happens Next? (guitar) (1998–2003)
 FxUxNx
 Virgin Killers (singer)
 Love Songs (vocals, guitar) (2000— )
 Chu Chi Nut Nut and the Pine Cone Express (guitar) (2001)
 Anal Mucus (drums) (2003–2004)
 Colbom (bass) (2003— )
 Conquest For Death (guitar) (2005— )
 This Is My Fist (drums) (2006— )
 Bobby Joe Ebola and the Children MacNuggits (guitar) (2010-- )

See also
Air guitar

References

External links 
 US Air Guitar
 Official Hot Lixx Hulahan Fansite

1973 births
American punk rock musicians
Living people
People from Pleasanton, California